The 1952 Detroit Tigers had a record of 50–104 (.325) — the worst record in Tigers' history until the 2003 Tigers lost 119 games. Virgil Trucks became the third pitcher in major league history to throw two no-hitters in one season.

Regular season 
The 1952 Tigers winning percentage ranks as the second worst in the Tigers' history, as shown in this chart.  The club was managed by Red Rolfe (April 15 through July 4), who compiled a win–loss record of 23–49 (.319), then by pitcher-manager Fred Hutchinson, who had a record of 27–55 (.329) from July 5 through closing day, September 28.

Season standings

Record vs. opponents

Notable transactions 
 June 3, 1952: Dizzy Trout, George Kell, Johnny Lipon, and Hoot Evers were traded by the Tigers to the Boston Red Sox for Walt Dropo, Fred Hatfield, Don Lenhardt, Johnny Pesky, and Bill Wight.
 August 14, 1952: Dick Littlefield, Marlin Stuart, Don Lenhardt and Vic Wertz were traded by the Tigers to the St. Louis Browns for Jim Delsing, Ned Garver, Bud Black and Dave Madison.

Roster

Player stats

Batting

Starters by position 
Note: Pos = Position; G = Games played; AB = At bats; H = Hits; Avg. = Batting average; HR = Home runs; RBI = Runs batted in

Other batters 
Note: G = Games played; AB = At bats; H = Hits; Avg. = Batting average; HR = Home runs; RBI = Runs batted in

Note: pitchers' batting statistics not included

Pitching

Starting pitchers 
Note: G = Games pitched; IP = Innings pitched; W = Wins; L = Losses; ERA = Earned run average; SO = Strikeouts

Other pitchers 
Note: G = Games pitched; IP = Innings pitched; W = Wins; L = Losses; ERA = Earned run average; SO = Strikeouts

Relief pitchers 
Note: G = Games pitched; W = Wins; L = Losses; SV = Saves; ERA = Earned run average; SO = Strikeouts

Awards and accomplishments

League top five finishers 
 Art Houtteman: AL leader in losses (20)
 Virgil Trucks: #2 in AL in losses (19)
 Ted Gray: #3 in AL in losses (17)

Players ranking among top 100 of all time at position 
The following members of the 1952 Detroit Tigers are among the Top 100 of all time at their positions, as ranked by The New Bill James Historical Baseball Abstract in 2001:
 Jerry Priddy: 73rd best second baseman of all time
 Johnny Pesky: 20th best shortstop of all time (played 69 games for 1952 Tigers)
 George Kell: 30th best third baseman of all time (played only 39 games for 1952 Tigers)
 Vic Wertz: 61st best right fielder of all time
 Harvey Kuenn: 62nd best right fielder of all time (played only 19 games for 1952 Tigers)
 Hal Newhouser: 36th best pitcher of all time
 Virgil Trucks: 61st best pitcher of all time

Walt Dropo's consecutive hits streak 
 Over a three game stretch from July 14 to July 15, Walt Dropo had hits in 12 consecutive plate appearances to tie a major league record also held by Johnny Kling (1902).

Farm system 

LEAGUE CHAMPIONS: Jamestown

Notes

References 

 Baseball-Reference.com 1952 Detroit Tigers

External links 

 BaseballLibrary.com 1952 Detroit Tigers season summary

Detroit Tigers seasons
Detroit Tigers season
Detroit Tigers
1952 in Detroit